The Trip to Bountiful is a play by American playwright Horton Foote. The play premiered March 1, 1953 on NBC-TV, before being produced on the Broadway stage from November 3, 1953 to December 5, 1953.

The play involves a "woman who has to live with a daughter-in-law who hates her and a son who does not dare take her side." While the unhappy family lives in a Houston apartment, Carrie Watts dreams of returning to Bountiful, where she was raised. She eventually runs away and embarks by bus to her destination. She meets several people along the way and upon her arrival, she is whisked back to Houston by her son and daughter-in-law.

The play was adapted into a film of the same name, released in 1985.

Production history
The play premiered on NBC television on March 1, 1953, starring Lillian Gish. It subsequently premiered on Broadway at Henry Miller's Theatre in November 1953 for a run of 39 performances. The play was produced Off-Broadway by the Signature Theatre Company at the Peter Norton Space in 2005. It was revived on Broadway at the Stephen Sondheim Theatre (which stands where Henry Miller's Theatre stood) from April 23, 2013 to October 9, 2013.

Vincent J. Donehue was the director of the NBC version, summer theatre preview versions, the 1953 Broadway version and the subsequent United States tour. The 2005 Off-Broadway production was directed by Harris Yulin. The 2013 Broadway revival was directed by Michael Wilson, with scenic design by Jeff Cowie, costumes by Van Broughton Ramsey lighting by Rui Rita, and original music and sound design by John Gromada. The 2013 production marked Cicely Tyson's first Broadway appearance since 1983. She was joined by Cuba Gooding Jr., Condola Rashād and Vanessa Williams. The African-American cast is a non-issue because the themes are blind to race.

Historical casting

Critical commentary
When the play debuted on Broadway in 1953, Brooks Atkinson wrote in The New York Times of Lillian Gish's performance in the role of Carrie Watts "As a weary old woman, homesick for her youth in the country, she gives an inspired performance that is alive in every detail and conveys unconquerable spirit." Of the production, Atkinson wrote "...the performance is so pitilessly exact that you can hardly tell where the writing leaves off and the acting begins." Atkinson describes Jo Van Fleet's role as Jessie Mae Watts, which earned the Tony Award for Best Featured Actress in a Play at the 8th Tony Awards as a "penetrating performance."

Lois Smith won the Drama Desk Award for Outstanding Actress in a Play, Outer Critics Circle Award Outstanding Actress in a Play, Obie Award Outstanding Performance and Lucille Lortel Award Outstanding Lead Actress, for her 2005 Off-Broadway leading performance as Carrie Watts. Smith was lauded in The New York Times by Ben Brantley with comments such as " I had never before realized how blue and bottomless her gaze is" and she "brings pure, revivifying oxygen to the role". Although a revival, Brantley noted "What this production provides that makes 'The Trip to Bountiful' seem newborn is its artful counterpoint of the smothering, claustrophobic details of daily life and Carrie's barrier-melting faith in her destiny."

In order to prepare for her role in the 2013 Broadway revival, Tyson visited playwright Horton Foote's home in rural Wharton, Texas. After viewing a matinee, Ben Brantley panned the production, calling it a "generally sluggish production" that "only fitfully captures the rhythms of everyday melancholy that you associate with Foote" and noted several other reservations such as, "This production allows too much dead air between lines...The show lacks the deceptively easy conversational flow" its director had previously demonstrated. He also notes that the show "often undercuts itself by broadening comic moments". Regarding Ms. Tyson's character singing hymns to herself during the production, Terry Teachout commented that during numerous performances, "a fair number of people in the theater sang along with her. It didn't look to me as though she was trying to encourage them, either: They just joined in..." and that a friend told him, "Three women sitting next to me started singing along, softly at first, and by the second hymn a good part of the audience was joyously singing with them. The theater was everyone's church that night, not just mine. To describe it sounds hokey, but it was anything but."

Awards and nominations

Original 1953 Broadway production

2005 Off-Broadway revival

2013 Broadway revival
The Broadway production was recognized with Drama League Award nominations for Outstanding Revival of a Broadway or Off-Broadway Play and with Distinguished Performance Award nominations for both Cicely Tyson and Vanessa L. Williams. The production received four Outer Critics Circle Award nominations: Outstanding Revival of a Play (Broadway or Off-Broadway), Outstanding Director of a Play (Michael Wilson), Outstanding Actress in a Play (Cicely Tyson) and Outstanding Featured Actress in a Play (Vanessa L. Williams), with Tyson winning. The play earned three 58th Drama Desk Award nominations, with Tyson winning for Outstanding Actress in a Play. The play received four Tony Award nominations for the 67th Tony Awards, winning Best Actress in a Play. The show received an Artios Award nomination from The Casting Society of America for Outstanding Achievement in Casting, New York Broadway Theatre – Drama.

Film adaptations
The Trip to Bountiful was adapted into a 1985 film starring Geraldine Page. Page won the Academy Award for Best Actress for her performance.

A made-for-television remake premiered on March 8, 2014 on the Lifetime network. The film featured Cicely Tyson in the lead role as Mrs. Carrie Watts, Vanessa Williams as Jessie Mae, Blair Underwood as Ludie, and Keke Palmer as Thelma. Tyson and Williams also appeared in the 2013 Broadway revival prior to this. Blair Underwood and Keke Palmer replaced Cuba Gooding, Jr. and Condola Rashād in the roles of Ludie Watts and Thelma from the Broadway cast. Tyson received a Primetime Emmy Award nomination for her performance.

Notes

External links
 
 
 
  (archive)
 
 
  (archive)

1953 plays
American plays adapted into films
Broadway plays
Houston in fiction
Off-Broadway plays
Plays based on television plays
Plays set in Texas